Haseena is a Bollywood erotic comedy-drama film directed by Vicky Ranawat and jointly produced by Jitendra B. Wagadia and Vicky Ranawat and co-produced by Saral Ranawat. The principal photography and shooting stated in 2017. In film three friends named Rohit, Rahul and Rajan try to impress a woman.

The film was initially set to release on July 14, 2017, which was reported to clash with the similarly titled Haseena Parkar.

Cast 

 Arpit Soni as  Rohit
 Ankur Verma as Rahul
 Mohit Arora as Rajan
 Inayat Sharma as Haseena

Production and release

The film went into production in 2017, and was released on 5 January 2018 domestically and in overseas markets.

Music 
There are totally 4 songs in this movie which are as follow.

References

External links
 

2010s Hindi-language films
2018 films
Films shot in Mumbai
Indian sex comedy films
Indian erotic drama films
2010s sex comedy films
2010s erotic drama films
2018 comedy-drama films